Juan Manuel Fuentes Angullo (born 7 April 1977) is a Spanish former cyclist who competed professionally from 2002 to 2005.

Major results
1999
 1st Overall Cinturón a Mallorca
2003
 1st GP Industria & Artigianato di Larciano
 1st GP Llodio
 9th Giro di Toscana

Grand Tour general classification results timeline

References

1977 births
Living people
Spanish male cyclists
Cyclists from Sydney